Bangerz (2013) is the fourth studio album by American recording artist Miley Cyrus.

Bangerz may also refer to:

 Bangerz Tour (2014), the associated fourth concert tour by Cyrus
 "SMS (Bangerz)", the third track on Bangerz, featuring Britney Spears
 The Bangerz, a California DJ group and MTV's 2008 America's Best Dance Crew Champions

See also
 Bangers (disambiguation)
 Bangor (disambiguation)